The 1972 Utah Utes football team was an American football team team that represented the University of Utah as a member of the Western Athletic Conference (WAC) during the 1972 NCAA University Division football season. In their fifth season under head coach Bill Meek, the Utes compiled an overall record of 6–5 with a mark of 5–2 against conference opponents, tying for second place in the WAC. Home games were played on campus at Robert Rice Stadium in Salt Lake City.

Schedule

Personnel

Season summary

BYU

References

External links
 Game program: Utah at Washington State – September 30, 1972 – Martin Stadium debut

Utah
Utah Utes football seasons
Utah Utes football